Isaac Ambrose Barber (January 26, 1852 – March 1, 1909) was a U.S. Representative from Maryland, serving from 1897 to 1899.

Born near Salem, New Jersey, Barber attended the common schools and studied medicine in Hahnemann Medical College of Philadelphia, Pennsylvania, from which he was graduated in 1872.  He commenced practice in Woodstown, New Jersey, and later moved to Easton, Maryland in 1873 and continued the practice of medicine for fifteen years.  He also engaged in the milling business.

Barber served as a member of the Maryland House of Delegates in 1895, and later as president of the Farmers & Merchants’ National Bank of Easton.  He was elected as a Republican to the Fifty-fifth Congress from Maryland's 1st congressional district, serving one term from March 4, 1897, to March 3, 1899.  After Congress, he resumed the milling business and also engaged in agricultural pursuits.  He also served as chairman of the Republican State central committee from 1900 to 1904.  Barber died in Easton in 1909, and is interred in Spring Hill Cemetery.

References

1852 births
1909 deaths
Drexel University alumni
People from Salem, New Jersey
People from Woodstown, New Jersey
Republican Party members of the Maryland House of Delegates
American bank presidents
Republican Party members of the United States House of Representatives from Maryland
19th-century American politicians
19th-century American businesspeople
Burials in Maryland